Montaigne may refer to:

People
 Michel de Montaigne (1533–1582; Lord of Montaigne), a French philosopher
 Aaron Montaigne, American punk rocker for Antioch Arrow
 Antoinette Montaigne (born 1965), a politician of France and Central African Republic
 George Montaigne (1569–1628), English Anglican bishop
 Lawrence Montaigne (1931–2017), American actor
 Marion Montaigne (born 1980), French cartoonist
 Montaigne (musician) (born 1995), Australian musician

Characters
 Catherine Montaigne, a fictional character from the literary universe Honorverse
 William LaMontaigne Jr., a fictional character from the TV series Criminal Minds

Places
 Montaigne (Natchez, Mississippi), USA; a historic building
 Château de Montaigne, Saint-Michel-de-Montaigne, Dordogne, Nouvelle-Aquitaine, France; a castle
 Avenue Montaigne, Paris, France; a street
 8890 Montaigne, a main-belt asteroid

Groups, organizations, companies
 Montaigne (record label), a French classical record company
 Naïve Montaigne or Montaigne, a record label of Naïve Records
 Bordeaux Montaigne University. Bordeaux, France; a university
 Institut Montaigne, a French nonprofit transpartisan thinktank
 Établissement Français d'Enseignement Montaigne, Cotonou, Benin; a French international school
 Lycée Montaigne (disambiguation), several schools

Other uses
 Montaigne's tower, a castle tower
 "Montaigne", a 1999 song by Pinback off their eponymous album Pinback

See also

 Canton of Pays de Montaigne et Gurson, Dordogne, Nouvelle-Aquitaine, France
 Avenue Montaigne (film), a 2006 film
 TransMontaigne, U.S. pipeline company
 
 Montagne (disambiguation)
 Mont (disambiguation)